Calhoun County is a county located in the south central part of the U.S. state of Arkansas. As of the 2020 census, the population was 4,739, making it the least populous county in Arkansas. The county seat is Hampton. Calhoun County is Arkansas's 55th county, formed on December 6, 1850, and named for John C. Calhoun, a Vice President of the United States.

The county is part of the Camden, AR Micropolitan Statistical Area.

History
This area was initially developed for plantation agriculture, based on large gangs of slave workers. The population was majority enslaved African Americans before the American Civil War. After the Reconstruction era, there was increasing white violence against blacks as the minority attempted to assert dominance over the freedmen. From 1877 to 1950, whites lynched 10 African Americans in the county, mostly in the decades around the turn of the century. Several other counties in the state had higher rates of such murders.

In September 1892, what became known as the "Hampton Race War", or the Calhoun County Race War, broke out across the southern part of the county. In 1891 the Democratic-dominated state legislature had passed laws to make voter registration more difficult for illiterate people both black and white, which effectively disenfranchised many of the poorer residents. But tensions were rising in this period, and the economy was poor. Whites resented that freedmen would work for lower wages, even if they knew the latter men seldom had a choice. Whitecappers, also called night riders, were poor white farmers and workers who acted as vigilantes, attacking various residents to enforce their moral views. They met in secret societies to patrol both black and white communities. Their reasons were also economic; they hoped to drive out the black workers.

The African Americans resented these attacks. Newspapers printed rumors of armed blacks planning attacks against whites, as was typical in tense times, inflaming existing tensions. There was also violence associated with the September election. Some newspapers reported that a white man named Unsill, an ex-convict Republican, led 42 armed blacks to the polls, "where they demanded to vote." Accounts of this period are contradictory, but agree that major events seemed to take place within several days, beginning about September 17, while incidents were reported over the month of September. An estimated five to eight African Americans were killed during the violence, with one or more described as lynched. At least two whites were killed in these encounters; more men on both sides were wounded. Among the dead was a black man murdered by two whites; as he was a key witness in a trial in which they were defendants, this appeared to be a "murder of convenience" done while other violence was prevalent.

20th century to present
Due to such violence, social oppression, economic problems, and mechanization of agriculture, many African Americans and whites left the county in the first half of the 20th century. Population declined in every census after 1920 through 1970, as may be seen in the table in the Demographics section below. African Americans left in the Great Migration to northern and midwestern industrial cities for work before World War II; during and after that war, many others went to the West Coast, where defense industries had more jobs.

The Shumaker Naval Ammunition Depot in Calhoun and Ouachita counties operated from 1945 until 1957.

The Southern Arkansas University Tech is a two-year college specializing in technical training.

The Lost 40 Acres of Timber
There are 40 acres of timber that have never been cut along the Wolf Branch (a tributary of Moro Creek) in southeast Calhoun County. Some of its large trees are over 200 years old.

Geography

Major highways
 Future Interstate 69
 U.S. Highway 79
 U.S. Highway 167
 U.S. Highway 278
 Highway 160

Adjacent counties
 Dallas County (north)
 Cleveland County (northeast)
 Bradley County (east)
 Union County (south)
 Ouachita County (west)

Demographics

2020 census

As of the 2020 United States census, there were 4,739 people, 1,850 households, and 1,302 families residing in the county.

2000 census
As of the 2000 United States Census, there were 5,744 people, 2,317 households, and 1,628 families residing in the county.  The population density was 9 people per square mile (4/km2).  There were 3,012 housing units at an average density of 5 per square mile (2/km2).  The racial makeup of the county was 74.51% White, 23.38% Black or African American, 0.21% Native American, 0.03% Asian, 0.92% from other races, and 0.94% from two or more races.  1.50% of the population were Hispanic or Latino of any race.

There were 2,317 households, out of which 31.20% had children under the age of 18 living with them, 55.60% were married couples living together, 11.30% had a female householder with no husband present, and 29.70% were non-families. 27.30% of all households were made up of individuals, and 12.60% had someone living alone who was 65 years of age or older.  The average household size was 2.43 and the average family size was 2.94.

In the county, the population was spread out, with 24.60% under the age of 18, 7.00% from 18 to 24, 28.20% from 25 to 44, 24.30% from 45 to 64, and 16.00% who were 65 years of age or older.  The median age was 39 years. For every 100 females, there were 92.70 males.  For every 100 females age 18 and over, there were 88.30 males.

The median income for a household in the county was $28,438, and the median income for a family was $34,647. Males had a median income of $30,353 versus $17,452 for females. The per capita income for the county was $15,555.  About 13.20% of families and 16.50% of the population were below the poverty line, including 19.90% of those under age 18 and 18.20% of those age 65 or over.

Government
Over the past few election cycles Calhoun County has trended heavily towards the GOP. The last Democrat (as of 2020) to carry this county was Bill Clinton in 1996.

Education
Public education for elementary and secondary school students is primarily provided by the Hampton School District, which leads to graduation from Hampton High School.

Communities

Cities
 Hampton (county seat)
 Thornton

Towns
 Harrell
 Tinsman

Townships
Note: Unlike most counties, Calhoun County has numbered townships instead of named townships.

 Township 1 (Thornton)
 Township 2
 Township 3 (Tinsman)
 Township 4 (Harrell)
 Township 5
 Township 6
 Township 7
 Township 8 (part of Hampton)
 Township 9 (most of Hampton)

See also
 List of lakes in Calhoun County, Arkansas
 National Register of Historic Places listings in Calhoun County, Arkansas

References

 
1850 establishments in Arkansas
Populated places established in 1850
Camden, Arkansas micropolitan area